Fahreddin-i Acemi (b. ? - d. 1460), was an Ottoman Islamic scholar and shaykh-ul-Islam.

He grew up with Seyyid Şerîf el-Cürcânî, and started his education in Iran, hence the last name "Ajami", meaning "from Persia". 

He is renowned for the important role he played in persecuting the Hurûfîs who were developing their influence over Islam. Grand vizier (Vezîriazam) Mahmud Pasha was particular worried by the supporters of Fazlallah Astarabadi and so concocted a plan whereby he invited them to visit his mansion. Fahreddin-i Acemi hid in a corner to listen to their ideas. After he had heard enough, he emerged from his hiding place and denounced them.

He is buried outside the Dârülhadîs Mosque.

References

1460 deaths
Sheikh-ul-Islams of the Ottoman Empire
Ottoman Empire-related lists
Islamic religious leaders
15th-century Muslim theologians
Islamic scholars from the Ottoman Empire
Shaykh al-Islāms